Arvind Panwar (born 9 March 1990) is an Indian road cyclist.

Major results

2008
 National Junior Road Championships
3rd Road race
3rd Time trial
2011
 3rd Time trial, National Road Championships
2012
 1st  Road race, National Road Championships
2013
 1st  Time trial, National Road Championships
 8th CFI International Race, Jaipur
2014
 2nd Time trial, National Road Championships
2016
 South Asian Games
1st  Time trial
1st  Team time trial
 National Road Championships
1st  Time trial
3rd Road race
 9th Time trial, Asian Road Championships
2017
 2nd Time trial, National Road Championships
2018
 1st  Time trial, National Road Championships
2019
 2nd  Time trial, South Asian Games
 2nd Time trial, National Road Championships
 7th Time trial, Asian Road Championships
2021
 3rd Time trial, National Road Championships
2022
 6th Team Time trial, Asian Road Championships

References

External links

1990 births
Living people
Indian male cyclists
Sportspeople from Meerut
South Asian Games gold medalists for India
South Asian Games silver medalists for India
South Asian Games medalists in cycling